Vladimirea krasilnikovae is a moth in the family Gelechiidae. It was described by Alexandr L. Lvovsky and Vladimir I. Piskunov in 1989. It is found in Gobi Desert.

References

Vladimirea
Moths of Asia
Gobi Desert
Moths described in 1989